Yoo Si-ah (born Yoo Yeon-joo on September 17, 1995), better known by her stage name YooA is a South Korean singer, and is a member of the girl group Oh My Girl under WM Entertainment. She made her debut as a solo artist, with her first EP Bon Voyage, on September 7, 2020.

Personal life 
YooA was born Yoo Yeon-joo on September 17, 1995, in Seoul, South Korea, and legally changed her name to Yoo Si-ah.

Her older brother is Yoo Jun-sun, a dancer and choreographer under the well-known 1Million Dance Studio.

Career

2015–2018: Debut and other activities

On April 20, 2015, YooA debuted in the South Korean girl group Oh My Girl. In August 2016, YooA took part in the Mnet dance TV show Hit The Stage with U-Kwon of Block B as her partner. They finished in fourth place behind her brother and his partner Hyoyeon. In November 2016, she debuted as a member of the Inkigayo project group, Sunny Girls, with the single, "Taxi". In Summer 2017, YooA joined the reality show Idol Drama Operation Team. They made their debut as Girls Next Door with the single, "Deep Blue Eyes".
 
In May 2018, YooA released the single "Morning Call".

2019–present: Bon Voyage
In August 2019, it was confirmed that YooA would be taking part in Queendom as a member of Oh My Girl.
 
On September 7, 2020, YooA made her solo debut with the extended play Bon Voyage. On September 15, 2020, YooA received her first music show trophy on The Show. On September 25, 2020, YooA released an OST for the Netflix film Over The Moon.

In October 2022, WM Entertainment announced that YooA was preparing for a new album with the goal of returning in November 14, titled Selfish.

Discography

Extended plays

Singles

Soundtrack appearances

Filmography

Television shows

Hosting

Music videos

Awards and nominations

Notes

References

External links 

 YooA on Instagram

1995 births
Living people
People from Seoul
Oh My Girl members
South Korean women pop singers
Singers from Seoul
K-pop singers
South Korean female idols
South Korean female dancers
WM Entertainment artists
21st-century South Korean singers
21st-century South Korean women singers
Japanese-language singers of South Korea